The Wuhan Sports Centre Stadium ( or Zhuankou Stadium is sports complex with a multi-use stadium in Wuhan, China. Completed in 2002, it has an all-seated capacity of 54,000.

Local football team Wuhan Guanggu played some high attendance matches at the stadium. It was one of the venues for the 2007 FIFA Women's World Cup and the sole venue for the final stage of the 2015 EAFF East Asian Cup. Football club Wuhan Zall were tenants. They drew an average home attendance of 14,403 in their inaugural top division league season in 2013. Currently, it is the home of Wuhan Three Towns.

The stadium also hosted the 2015 Asian Athletics Championships.

At the height of COVID-19 pandemic in 2020, the stadium was one of the locations serving as Fangcang Hospital.

Notable Events
 G.E.M. - Queen of Hearts World Tour - 28 May 2017
 Joker Xue - I Think I've Seen You Somewhere Tour - 22 April 2017

References

External links

Sports venues in Wuhan
Football venues in Wuhan
Football venues in China
2007 FIFA Women's World Cup stadiums
Sports venues completed in 2002